Sarah Mary Taylor (August 12, 1916 – 2000) was an African American quiltmaker from Mississippi whose work attracted interest in the 1970s.

Life 
Sarah Mary Taylor was born on August 12, 1916 in Anding, Mississippi. She learned quilting from her mother Pearlie Posey when she was young. She lived on plantations in the Mississippi Delta and worked as a housekeeper, cook, and field hand. Late in her life, Taylor was forced to retire due to her failing health. She then earned income through quilting, using the skirts of dresses to create pieced quilts. Taylor garnered more interest in her appliquéd quilts after Pecolia Warner's quilts were the subject of University of Mississippi professors academic interest in the 1970s.

Both Taylor and her mother created quilt and pillow designs that employed red Vodun doll-like figures. Her Mermaid quilt (earlier known as Rabbit) is evocative of the mojo hand, featuring blue hands adjacent to red squares and vodou figures. According to art historian Maude Southwell Wahlman, Taylor "has made numerous quilts that play on the symbolic connotations and aesthetic qualities of the hand image." Wahlman writes that Taylor's Cross quilt may represent a continuation of the Kongo cosmogram, a Kongo religious symbol. Taylor's quilts also employ incongruous and clashing color combinations. She was commissioned to make a hand quilt for the film The Color Purple. Both this quilt and an appliquéd word quilt of hers form part of the Ella King Torrey Collection of African American Quilts.

Taylor married five times and had one child, Willie, who preceded her in death. She died July 10, 2000.

Taylor's quilts have been displayed in Naperville, Illinois, Santa Fe, New Mexico, and Philadelphia, Pennsylvania, among other American cities. Marilyn Nelson wrote the poem "The Century Quilt" for her.

References

1916 births
2000 deaths
American artisans
Artists from Mississippi
People from Yazoo County, Mississippi
Quilters
20th-century American women artists
20th-century American artists
20th-century African-American women
20th-century African-American artists